This is a list of notable Cubans, ordered alphabetically by first name within each category.

Additional lists
For Cuban-Americans please see List of Cuban Americans

Art and entertainment

Actors

Ana de Armas, actress
Ana Margarita Martínez-Casado, actress and singer
Andy García, actor
Roberto Escobar, actor
César Évora, actor
Daisy Fuentes, actress
Desi Arnaz, actor
Emiliano Díez, actor
Enrique Molina, actor
Faizon Love, actor and comedian
Francisco Gattorno, actor
Julio Oscar Mechoso, actor
Luis Oquendo, actor
Luisa Martínez Casado (1860-1925), actress
Manela Bustamante, actress
María Conchita Alonso, actress
Mario Cimarro, actor 
Mario Ernesto Sánchez, actor and founder of Teatro Avante
Renny Arozarena, actor
Steven Bauer, actor
Velia Martínez, actress and singer
William Levy, actor
Nobel Vega, actor, "Tio Nobel"

Architects
Raúl de Armas
Nicolas Arroyo
Max Borges Jr.
Max Borges del Junco
Felicia Chateloin
Leonardo Morales y Pedroso
Ricardo Porro
Antonio Quintana Simonetti
Eugenio Rayneri Piedra
Mario Romañach

Artists, photographers and fashion designers 

Agustín Cárdenas, sculptor
Alberto Korda, photographer
Alexandre Arrechea, painter, sculptor
Amelia Peláez, painter
Baruj Salinas, painter
Carlos Enríquez, painter
Fidelio Ponce de León, painter
Herman Puig (born German Puig Paredes), photographer
Humberto Jesús Castro García, painter
José Bernal, painter
José Vilalta Saavedra, sculptor
Josignacio, creator of plastic paint medium, contemporary painter
Juan José Sicre, sculptor
Juan T. Vázquez Martín, painter
Lourdes Gomez Franca, painter
Luis Castaneda, photographer
Mario Perez, painter
Miguel Fleitas, painter, photographer
Miguel Rodez, painter, sculptor
Pedro Álvarez Castelló, painter
Rafael Consuegra, sculptor
Raúl Corrales, photographer
Raúl Martínez, pop artist, painter
Rene Mederos, poster artist and graphic designer
René Portocarrero, painter
Tomas Sanchez, painter
Victor Manuel, painter
Waldo Diaz-Balart, painter
Wifredo Lam, painter

Authors and poets

Alejo Carpentier, novelist
Antonio Benitez-Rojo, author
Brígida Agüero, poet
Daína Chaviano, author
Carilda Oliver Labra, poet
Domitila García de Coronado, writer and journalist
Dulce María Loynaz, author
Edmundo Desnoes, author
Gertrudis Gómez de Avellaneda, author, poet
Guillermo Cabrera Infante, author
Heberto Padilla, poet
Héctor Zumbado, writer, journalist, humorist, critic
José Ignacio Rivero, author and journalist
Antonio Rodríguez Salvador, poet, author
José Lezama Lima, author, poet
José María Heredia y Campuzano, poet
José Martí, author, poet, journalist
Julián del Casal, 19th-century poet
Leonardo Padura Fuentes, novelist, journalist
Mariano Brull, author
Nancy Morejón, author
José Gómez-Sicre, art critic and author
Nicolás Guillén, poet
Norberto Fuentes, author
Pedro Juan Gutiérrez, author, poet, painter
Pedro Luis Boitel, poet
Raúl Rivero, poet and journalist
Reinaldo Arenas, author
Severo Sarduy, poet
Virgilio Piñera, author, playwright, poet, short-story writer and essayist
Zoé Valdés, author
Cirilo Villaverde

Composers

Alejandro García Caturla, symphonic composer
Mariá Álvarez Rios, composer
Antonio María Romeu, composer
Arsenio Rodríguez, developer of the rumba
Didier Hernández, singer composer
Ernesto Lecuona, often regarded as the greatest Cuban composer
Esteban Salas y Castro, 18th century Cuban baroque composer
Gonzalo Roig, often regarded as one of the greatest composers of Cuba, "Quiere me mucho"/ Cecilia Valdez
Ignacio Cervantes, Chopinesque piano composer
José White Lafitte, violinist and composer
Leo Brouwer, guitarist and composer
Yalil Guerra, composer
Amadeo Roldán, composer and violinist
Dámaso Pérez Prado, developer of the mambo
Armando Rodriguez-Gonzalez, composer
Antonio Rodríguez Ferrer, composer
René Touzet, composer, bandleader and pianist
Flores Chaviano, guitarist and composer
Danilo Avilés, composer
Magaly Ruiz, composer
José Ardévol, composer
Harold Gramatges, composer
Carlos Fariñas, composer
Roberto Valera, composer
Julián Orbón, composer
Margarita Lecuona, singer and composer

Chess
 José Raúl Capablanca, chess world champion, grandmaster considered "the Mozart of Chess"
 Juan Corzo, chess
 Lázaro Bruzón, chess grandmaster
 María Teresa Mora

Musicians

Aida Diestro, pianist, arranger
Albita, singer
Alfredo de la Fé, musician
Adalberto Álvarez, pianist, director, composer
Ángel Reyes, violinist
AJ McLean, singer, member of American boyband The Backstreet Boys
Armando Peraza, percussionist
Arturo Sandoval, trumpeter
Arsenio Rodríguez, composer
Benny Moré, singer, songwriter, conductor, arranger
Bola de Nieve, singer, pianist
Cándido Fabré, musician, songwriter, singer
Carlos Manuel Pruneda, singer
Carlos Varela, singer, songwriter
Celia Cruz, singer
Celina González, singer-songwriter
Cesar "Pupy" Pedroso, pianist, musician
Christina Milian, singer
Chucho Valdés,  pianist, bandleader, composer, arranger
Compay Segundo, musician, songwriter
Conchita Espinosa, pianist, teacher
Cuban Link, rapper
Cubanito 20.02, hip-hop band
Dave Lombardo, drummer
David Calzado, musician
Didier Hernández, singer, songwriter
Donna Maria Martinez, guitarist and singer
Elena Burke, singer
El Medico, timba musician
Eliades Ochoa, guitarist and singer
Emilio Estefan, producer, composer
Ernesto Lecuona, pianist, composer
Esther Borja, singer
Eusebio Delfín, singer
Francisco Aguabella, percussionist
German Nogueira Gomez, songwriter, composer, producer
Gloria Estefan, singer, composer
Gonzalo Rubalcaba, pianist
Guillermo Portabales, singer, songwriter
Guillermo Rubalcaba, musician
Harold Lopez Nussa, jazz pianist
Horacio Gutiérrez, concert pianist
Hubert de Blanck, pianist, composer
Ignacio Piñeiro, composer
Ibrahim Ferrer, musician
Issac Delgado, singer
Jacobo Rubalcaba, musician
Jorge Bolet, concert pianist
Juan Croucier, bassist
Juan Formell, composer
Juan de Marcos González, musician
La Lupe, singer
Lena, singer
Lissette, singer
Magali del Valle, opera singer
Malena Burke, singer
Manuel Barrueco, classical guitarist
María Teresa Vera, composer, guitarist, singer
Mayra Verónica, singer
Miguel Matamoros, singer, composer
Moisés Valle, musician
Moisés Simons, composer
Mongo Santamaría, jazz musician
Moraima Secada, singer
Nelson Martinez, baritone
Ñico Saquito, composer, singer
Olga Guillot, singer
Omara Portuondo, singer
Orlando "Cachaito" López, bassist
Pablo Milanés, singer, songwriter
Pío Leyva, singer
Pitbull, rapper
Raul Paz, singer
Rey Ruiz, singer
Rita Montaner, singer
Roberto Faz, singer, conductor
Rubén González, pianist
Rudy Sarzo, rock bassist
Sen Dog, rapper
Silvio Rodríguez, singer, songwriter
Tico Torres, drummer, percussionist
Willy Chirino, singer, songwriter
Voltaire (musician), musician
Xavier Cugat, musician
Yalil Guerra, producer, musician, composer
Yotuel Romero, rapper

Film directors

Ernesto Daranas
Fernando Pérez
Humberto Padrón
Jorge Luis Sánchez
Juan Carlos Cremata
Juan Padrón
Miguel Coyula
Rodrigo García
Santiago Álvarez
Tomás Gutiérrez Alea

Journalists

Calixto Martínez
German Pinelli
Héctor Zumbado, writer, journalist, humorist, and critic
Nicolás Guillén
Oscar Espinosa Chepe
Pablo de la Torriente Brau
Raúl Rivero
Rick Sanchez

Dancers

Alicia Alonso, Prima Ballerina Assoluta, director of the Cuban National Ballet (Ballet Nacional de Cuba)
Carlos Acosta, dancer
Sadaise Arencibia, star dancer with the Cuban National Ballet
Fernando Bujones, dancer
Jose Manuel Carreño, American Ballet Theatre principal dancer
Lydia Diaz Cruz, prima ballerina
Miguel Campaneria, ballet dancer, currently artistic director of the National Ballet Theater of Puerto Rico
Vida Guerra, video dancer
Yat-Sen Chang, principal dancer, English National Ballet

Other entertainment

Alvarez Guedes, comedian and author
Ana María Polo, television personality and lawyer
Alina María Hernández, "Cachita", television personality
Cristina Saralegui, magazine editor, talk show host (Cristina) and actress
Vida Guerra, model/actress
Lili Estefan, television personality and former model
Mauricio Zeilic, television personality
Mayra Verónica, model
Nelson Ascencio, comedian (Madtv)
Pedro Zamora, AIDS activist, featured on The Real World: San Francisco
Raúl De Molina, television personality
Raúl Musibay, Food Network chef and author
Rosaura Andreu, children's television entertainer

Sport

Baseball

 Adeiny Hechavarria, Miami Marlins
 Adolfo Luque, Cincinnati Reds
 Alex Fernandez, Chicago White Sox, Florida Marlins
 Alex Sánchez
 Ariel Pestano, Cuba national baseball team
 Ariel Prieto, Oakland Athletics
 Aroldis Chapman, Cincinnati Reds
 Aurelio Monteagudo, Kansas City Athletics
 Barbaro Canizares, Atlanta Braves
 Bárbaro Garbey, Detroit Tigers
 Bert Campaneris, Kansas City Athletics
 Brayan Peña, Atlanta Braves
 Cristóbal Torriente, Negro leagues, Baseball Hall of Fame
 Danys Báez, Baltimore Orioles
 Diego Seguí, Kansas City Athletics
 Eli Marrero, New York Mets
 Esteban Bellán, first Latin American professional baseball player to play in the United States
 Germán Mesa, trainer for the Cuban national baseball team
 Jack Calvo, Washington Senators
 Jorge Soler, Chicago Cubs
 José Abreu, Chicago White Sox
 José Canseco, Oakland Athletics
 José Cardenal, San Francisco Giants
 José Contreras, Chicago White Sox
 José Fernández, Miami Marlins
 José Iglesias, Detroit Tigers
 José Méndez, Kansas City Monarchs, Baseball Hall of Fame
 José Rodríguez, New York Giants
 José Tartabull, Kansas City Athletics
 Kendrys Morales, Kansas City Royals
 Liván Hernández, Arizona Diamondbacks
 Luis Tiant, Cleveland Indians
 Martín Dihigo, Negro leagues, Baseball Hall of Fame
 Mike Cuellar, Cincinnati Reds
 Minnie Miñoso, Chicago White Sox
 Octavio "Cookie" Rojas, Cincinnati Reds
 Omar Linares, Pinar del Río Vegueros, Cuban national baseball team
 Orestes Destrade, New York Yankees, ESPN on-air personality
 Orlando Hernández, New York Mets
 Ozzie Canseco, Oakland Athletics
 Pedro Ramos, Washington Senators
 Preston Gómez, Washington Senators
 Rafael Palmeiro, Baltimore Orioles
 Ray Noble, New York Giants
 René Arocha, St. Louis Cardinals
 René Monteagudo, Washington Senators
 Rey Ordóñez, New York Mets
 Roberto "Bobby" Estalella, Washington Senators
 Rolando Arrojo, Tampa Bay Devil Rays
 Sandy Amorós, Brooklyn Dodgers
 Tony Fossas, Texas Rangers
 Tony González, Cincinnati Reds
 Tony Oliva, Minnesota Twins
 Tony Pérez, Cincinnati Reds
 Tony Taylor, Chicago Cubs
 Yuniesky Betancourt, last played for the Milwaukee Brewers
 Yasiel Puig, Los Angeles Dodgers
 Yasmani Grandal, Los Angeles Dodgers
 Yoenis Céspedes, New York Mets
 Zoilo Versalles, Minnesota Twins, first Latin American Major League MVP in 
 Alexei Ramírez, Chicago White Sox
 Yunel Escobar, Washington Nationals

Boxing

 Adolfo Horta, featherweight Olympic boxer
 Ariel Hernández, Middleweight Olympic boxer
 Armando Martínez, light middle-weight Olympic boxer
 Benny Paret, boxer
 Eliseo Castillo, boxer
 Félix Savón, Olympic boxer
 Florentino Fernández, boxer
 Guillermo Rigondeaux Ortiz, amateur boxer
 Joel Casamayor, boxer
 Jorge Rubio, boxing trainer
 José Nápoles, boxer
 Kid Charol, boxer
 Kid Chocolate, boxer
 Kid Gavilán, boxer
 Lorenzo Aragon Armenteros, Olympic welterweight boxer
 Luis Manuel Rodríguez, boxer
 Mario César Kindelán Mesa, Olympic gold medal-winning boxer
 Raúl González, boxer
 Roberto Balado, Olympic super heavyweight boxer
 Sugar Ramos, world champion boxer
 Teófilo Stevenson, amateur boxer
 Yan Bartelemí, light flyweight gold medal winning boxer
 Yanqui Díaz, boxer
 Yudel Johnson Cedeno light-welterweight Olympic boxer
 Yuriorkis Gamboa, flyweight Olympic gold medal-winning boxer

Athletes

 Alberto Juantorena, track
 Aliecer Urrutia, triple jump
 Ana Fidelia Quirot, 800m
 Anier García, hurdler
 Dayron Robles, hurdling athlete
 Emeterio González, javelin thrower
 Héctor Herrera, sprinter
 Ioamnet Quintero, high jumper
 Iván García, sprinter
 Iván Pedroso, long jump
 Javier Sotomayor, track and field record setter
 Joel Isasi, sprinter
 Joel Lamela, sprinter
 Jorge Aguilera, sprinter
 Lázaro Martínez, sprinter
 Luis Alberto Pérez-Rionda, sprinter
 Osleidys Menéndez, javelin
 Roberto Hernández
 Roberto Moya, discus throw
 Víctor Moya, high jumper
 Yargelis Savigne, jump
 Yarisley Silva, pole vaulter
 Yipsi Moreno, hammer thrower
 Yoandri Betanzos, triple jump
 Yoel García, triple jumper
 Yoel Hernández, hurdler
 Yudelkis Fernández, long jumper
 Yunaika Crawford, hammer thrower
 Yuniel Hernández, hurdler

Swimming
 Joel Armas, record holder in the US in monofin swimming
 Neisser Bent, bronze medalist at the 1996 Summer Olympics
 Rodolfo Falcón, silver medalist at the 1996 Summer Olympics
 Leonel "Bebito" Smith, gold medalist in the 1926 and 1930 Central American and Caribbean Games

Other

 Deborah Andollo, holds world records in free diving
 Alberto Delgado, soccer
 Ivan Dominguez, two time gold medalist in the Pan American Games and Cuban national champion in cycling
 Héctor Socorro, footballer
 Ibrahim Rojas, flatwater canoer
 Juan Tuñas, former Cuban footballer
 Manrique Larduet, gymnast
 Rafael A. Lecuona, gymnast
 Rey Ángel Martínez, soccer
 Tomás Fernández,  footballer in the 1938 World Cup
 Yanelis Yuliet Labrada Diaz, Olympic silver medallist in Taekwondo
 Maykel Galindo, soccer
 Jorge Sánchez Salgado, volleyball player

Politics

Current

Abelardo Colomé Ibarra, vice president of the Council of State of Cuba
Alfonso Fraga-Perez, diplomat, Secretary General of the Organization of Solidarity of the People of Asia, Africa & Latin America (OSPAAAL), former Head of Cuban Interests Section
Carlos Lage Dávila, former executive Secretary of the Council of Ministers of Cuba
Felipe Pérez Roque, former Cuban government minister
Fidel Castro, previous First Secretary of the Communist Party of Cuba
José Luis Rodríguez García, Cuban government minister
José Ramón Balaguer Cabrera, current Minister for Health in Cuba
Juan Almeida Bosque, third ranking member of the Cuban Council of State
Luis Posada Carriles, Cuban paramilitary leader, accused terrorist
Mariela Castro,  director of the Cuban National Center for Sex Education and daughter of Raúl Castro
Oscar Elías Biscet, physician and dissident and founder of the Lawton Foundation, currently jailed
Oswaldo Payá, founder of Proyecto Varela
Raúl Castro, current First Secretary of the Communist Party of Cuba
Liaena Hernandez Martínez, youngest member of the Cuban National Assembly
Roberto Fernández Retamar, President of the Casa de las Américas
Ricardo Alarcón, President of the Cuban National Assembly
Rosa Elena Simeón Negrín, former Minister of Science, Technology and the Environment
Pedro Pablo Prada Quintero, diplomat

Historical

 Abel Santamaría, Cuban revolutionary
 Alcibiades Hidalgo, former ambassador to the UN
 Ana Betancourt, first to campaign for equal rights for Cuban women, in 1868 during the Ten Years' War
 Andrés Rivero Agüero, Cuba's prime minister from March 1957 to March 1958
 Anselmo Alliegro, acting president of Cuba for one day (1–2 January 1959) after the departure of General Fulgencio Batista from the country
 Antonio Guiteras, politician and revolutionary
 Antonio Maceo, revolutionary, military strategist
 Armando Hart Dávalos, politician and Communist leader
 Camilo Cienfuegos, Cuban revolutionary
 Carlos Hevia, provisional president of Cuba 1934
 Carlos Manuel Piedra, acting president of Cuba for one day (2 January 1959) after the departure of General Fulgencio Batista from the country
 Carlos Prío Socarrás, former President of Cuba
 Celia Sánchez, Cuban revolutionary and Secretary to the Presidency of the Council of Ministers
 Cosme Torres Espinoza, ambassador to Zimbabwe
 Eduardo Chibás, Cuban politician who used radio to broadcast his political views against Batista's government to the public
 Federico Laredo Brú, President of Cuba from 1936 to 1940
 Fernando Tarrida del Mármol, Cuban anarchist
 Fabio Grobart, Communist leader
 Fulgencio Batista, former Cuban President
 Frank País, 20th century revolutionary
 Gerardo Machado, Cuban president 1920–33
 Gustavo Arcos, Cuban Revolutionary later became an imprisoned dissident
 Huber Matos, Cuban Revolutionary
 Ignacio Agramonte, 19th century Cuban revolutionary
 Jorge Mas Canosa, founder of the Cuban American National Foundation
 José Miró Cardona, President of Cuba in 1959
 José Martí, poet, philosopher, politician, writer, revolutionary
 Juan Carlos Robinson Agramonte, former member of the Cuban politburo and first Secretary of the Provincial Committee of the Cuban Communist Party in Santiago de Cuba
 Julio Antonio Mella, founder of the original Cuban Communist Party
 Jorge Payret, diplomat and academic 
 Leopoldo Cancio, deputy and Sectetary of Education 
 Manuel Piñeiro, first head of the Cuban General Intelligence Directorate
 Manuel Urrutia Lleó, provisional Cuban President January to July 1959
 Miguel Mariano Gómez, President of Cuba for seven months in 1936
 Paul Lafargue, Cuban-born French Communist and son-in-law to Karl Marx
 Pedro Pablo Cazañas, Cuban judge and politician
 Rafael Diaz-Balart, Cuban politician and majority leader during presidency of Batista
 Ramón Grau, Cuban president for two terms 1933, 1940–44
 Saturnino and Mariano Lora, brothers and 19th century revolutionaries
 Vilma Espín Guillois, President of the Cuban Federation of Women, wife of Raúl Castro
 Virgilio Paz Romero, anti-Castro paramilitary

Religion

 Alfredo Llaguno-Canals, former Auxiliary Bishop of Havana
 Miguel A. De La Torre, prolific author on Hispanic religiosity
 Agustin Roman, retired Auxiliary Bishop of Miami
 Braulio Orue-Vivanco, former Bishop of Pinar del Río
 Eduardo Tomas Boza-Masvidal, former Auxiliary Bishop of Havana
 Félix Varela, beatified priest, candidate for sainthood
 Jaime Lucas Ortega y Alamino, Cardinal Archbishop of Havana
 Meyer Rosenbaum, former rabbi and spiritual leader in Havana

Royalty and nobility
Maria Teresa, Grand Duchess of Luxembourg
Edelmira Ignacia Adriana Sampedro-Robato, Countess of Covadonga, first wife of Alfonso Prince of Asturias
Marta Ester Rocafort-Altazarra, second wife of Alfonso Prince of Asturias

Military

 Adolfo Fernández Cavada, captain in the Union Army during the American Civil War who later served as commander-in-chief of the Cinco Villas during Cuba's Ten Year War
 Alberto Bayo y Giroud, Cuban military leader of the defeated left-wing Loyalists in the Spanish Civil War
 Antonio Maceo Grajales, second-in-command of the Cuban army of independence
 Arnaldo Ochoa, Cuban general
 Calixto García, Cuban soldier in the Ten Years' War
 Carlos Manuel de Céspedes, Cuban general in the war of independence against the Spanish
 Eliseo Reyes Rodríguez, Cuban guerrillero
 Emilio Mola Vidal (1887–1937), Nationalist commander during the Spanish Civil War (1936–39); known for coining the phrase "fifth column"
 Federico Fernández Cavada, colonel in the Union Army during the American Civil War; later commander-in-chief of all the Cuban forces during Cuba's Ten Year War
 Jesús Sosa Blanco, captain in the Cuban army under Fulgencio Batista
 José Braulio Alemán, Cuban general in the Spanish–American War
 José Miguel Gómez, Cuban General in the war of independence against the Spanish
 Julius Peter Garesché, lieutenant colonel in the Union Army who served as chief of staff, with the rank of lieutenant colonel to Maj. Gen. William S. Rosecrans
 Loreta Janeta Velazquez, a.k.a. "Lieutenant Harry Buford", Velazquez was a Cuban-born woman who masqueraded as a male Confederate soldier during the Civil War
 Manuel Artime, leader of the Bay of Pigs invasion in 1961
 Máximo Gómez, 19th-century leader of Cuban forces in the wars of independence
 Pedro Luis Diaz Lanz, chief air force commander and member of Operation 40
 Víctor Dreke, Communist leader and a general in the Revolutionary Armed Forces
 Tomás Diez Acosta, revolutionary soldier and historian
 Víctor Ivo Acuña Velázquez, military commander
 Pilar Garcia, pre-revolutionary Chief of National Police

Science

Luis Alvarez, winner of the 1968 Nobel Prize in Physics, worked on the Manhattan Project
Agustin Walfredo Castellanos, physician
Carlos Juan Finlay, epidemiologist,  proposed the mode of transmission of yellow fever and was instrumental in assisting Walter Reed with his studies in Cuba
Juan Gundlach, 19th century naturalist and taxonomist
Celia Hart, Cuban physicist
Arnaldo Tamayo Méndez, first Cuban cosmonaut and the first person from a country in the Western Hemisphere other than the U.S. to travel to space
Hilda Molina, former chief neurosurgeon in Cuba
Felipe Poey, zoologist

Other categories

Sebastian Arcos Bergnes, human rights activist
Ramón Castro, older brother of Fidel and Raúl Castro
Mirta Diaz-Balart, Fidel Castro's first wife
Enriqueta García y Martín, prominent Cuban socialite, businesswoman and landowner
Delfín Fernández, High ranking government official, defected to Spain
Gregorio Fuentes, Cuban nautical captain
Elián González, boy who came to the US, leading to a custody battle between his American family and his father in Cuba
Jose Miguel Battle, Sr., former Godfather of the Cuban Mafia
Antonio Sánchez de Bustamante y Sirven, Judge of the Permanent Court of International Justice at the Hague 
Dr. Eduardo J. Padrón, educator and college president
Jesús Permuy, human rights activist, architect, urban planner, community leader
Ignacio José Urrutia (born 1730), historian
Nitza Villapol, Cuban chef

Non-resident Cubans
 List of Cuban-Americans
 List of Cuban-Mexicans
 Dane Bowers
 Guillermo Cabrera Infante
 Yat-Sen Chang
 Sienna Guillory
 William Montagu (Yznaga)
 Consuelo Yznaga
 Taismary Agüero
 Mirka Francia
 Libania Grenot
 Magdelín Martínez
 Alex Cabrera
 Majandra Delfino
 Viviana Gibelli
 Arturo Miranda
 Eduardo Sebrango
 Bárbara Bermudo
 Mike Lowell
 Carlos Ponce
 Rita Marley
 Ziggy Marley
 Lenny Martinez
 Mariane Pearl
 Oscar Isaac

References

See also

List of people by nationality